Randwick City Saints Australian Football Club (previously known as Saints AFC) is an Australian rules football club based in Sydney, Australia. The club colours are black, white and red. The Saints play in the Platinum Division of the AFL Sydney league and an over 35s side, the Maroubra Sinners. The Maroubra Saints junior AFL club are the local junior feeder club.

The Senior side has made the finals each year since joining the Sydney AFL comp and were runners up in 2013. The Reserve Grade side won the Division Five premiership in 2013 under captain/coach Peter Conduit.

The Club won its first senior premiership, winning the 2014 Division 3 flag in a dominant display over Penrith.

In round 2 of the 2016 season, saints young gun David 'Sea Gull' King, narrowly missed out of the Sydney AFL rising star award, it is speculated that he would have taken home the nomination however ineligibility due to him playing in the senior team last year culled his chances.

The Saints home ground is Pioneers Park located in the south-eastern Sydney suburb of Malabar.

In December 2012 the name of the club was changed to Randwick City Saints AFC.

In March 2019, the fifth division team sensationally announced ex-AFL player Joshua Ford as the Captain of the Reserves team, while Ford was concurrently serving a club suspension for stealing all of the pies. The club suspension has since been lifted.

Sponsorship
As of 2020, the Randwick City Saints have several partners ranging from kit endorsement to website support.

Coogee Bay Hotel, Tudor Hotel Redfern, Yulli's Brews, Yves Silveira Physiotherapy and Champ Mouthguards are among the list of Randwick City Saints sponsors

References

External links
 

Australian rules football clubs in Sydney
2010 establishments in Australia
Australian rules football clubs established in 2010